Elizabeth Cobbold or Carolina Petty Pasty born Elizabeth Knipe (1767–17 October, 1824) was a British writer and poet.

Life
Cobbold was born Elizabeth Knipe in Watling Street, London in 1767 to Robert Knipe. Her mother's maiden name was Waller. She was baptised in the now lost church of St Olave Silver Street In November 1790 she married William Clarke a portman of Ipswich who worked for the customs. William was older than her and disabled and he died after less than a year. By this time she had published her first novel The Sword, or Father Bertrand's History of his own Times which was influenced by her friend Clara Reeve. The following year after becoming a widow she married the Ipswich brewer John Cobbold and she became the stepmother of fifteen children as well as, in time, giving birth to an additional seven. In 1814 they moved to a house at Holywells Park in Ipswich from their previous house, The Cliff.

Despite this number of children she published under the pseudonym of Carolina Petty Pasty a poetical piece which included a portrait which was her work too. In 1803 she served as editor to a volume of poems by Ann Candler. She continued to do charitable work and in 1812 she started a clothing society for small children and in 1820 a charitable bazaar.

From 1806 Cobbold was known for Valentine Day cards which had verses written by herself and she published these in 1813 and 1814. The verses were attached to cleverly cut paper and it has been said that the skill of the cutting exceeded the quality of the poetry.

There are extant oil paintings of Elizabeth and her husband John which are attributed to George Frost. Her son Richard Cobbold was also a noted writer.

Elizabeth Cobbold as a Geologist

Elizabeth was also one of the first geologists. She collected fossils from the Red Crag Formation in the grounds of Holywells park. One of these, Nucula cobboldiae, was named after her by James Sowerby and included in  Mineral Conchology of Great Britain. The sample is now located in the Museums Victoria Collections, Australia. The , a rare species of shellfish, was also named after her by George Sowerby.

Literary works
Poems on various subjects. 1783.
Six narrative poems 1787.
The sword; or, Father Bertrand's history of his own times 1791.
The mince pie, an heroic epistle 1800.
Cliff valentines. 1813, 1814
An ode on the victory of Waterloo 1815.
Monody to the memory of Mrs. Byles 1818.
Poems, with a memoir of the author [ed. Laetitia Jermyn]. 1825.

References

1767 births
1824 deaths
Writers from London
British women poets
18th-century British poets
19th-century British poets
British women novelists
18th-century British novelists
19th-century British novelists
18th-century British women writers
18th-century British writers
19th-century British women writers
19th-century British writers
Elizabeth
18th-century British geologists
Women geologists
19th-century British geologists
Writers from Ipswich